Govula Gopanna is a 1968 Indian Telugu-language comedy drama film, produced by Lakshmi Rajyam and Sridhar Rao and directed by C. S. Rao. The film stars Akkineni Nageswara Rao, Rajasree and Bharathi, with music composed by Ghantasala. It is a remake of the 1966 Kannada film Emme Thammanna.

Plot 
Gopanna is an innocent cowherd. In the same town, Municipal Chairman Nagaraju a vicious, and undertakes a lot of atrocities and anti-social activities. He has two children, a vainglory daughter Tara, and a warm-hearted son Kasthuri. Once, Tara whips Gopanna's cows, in turn, he strikes her. So, Nagaraju sends his men to eliminate him when Kasthuri rescues him and advises Gopanna to meet Advocate Narasimham by changing his attire. Narasimham is a justice-seeking person who always countermoves against Nagaraju and leads a delightful life with his ideal wife Mahalakshmi. He fixes his daughter Radha's alliance with his childhood friend Sripathi's son Shekar one that resembles Gopanna. By the time, Gopanna reaches their residence they honor him misinterpreting him as Shekar and he falls for Radha. Shekar arrives to apprentice Narasimham and goes into the clutches of Nagaraju. Anyhow, he escapes and reaches Narasimham where he gets surprised to see Gopanna and learns the facts. Right now, they start a confusing drama without revealing their identity. Eventually, Sekhar loves Tara. Hither, Radha fallacies Gopanna witnessing the intimacy of Sekhar & Tara when Shekar affirms the reality. Being cognizant of it, Narasimham necks out Gopanna and decides to nuptial Radha with Shekar he refuses, proclaiming his love affair. At that moment, Narasimham reveals Nagaraju as the homicide of his father Sripathi, who has safeguarded pieces of evidence against Nagaraju in a diary. Listening to it, Shekar breaks down on Nagaraju and gets captivated. Immediately, Narasimham rushes, and Nagaraju seeks to slay him. In time, Gopanna rescues him before Shekar shifts underground. Meanwhile, Gopanna finds the whereabouts of the diary, ceases Nagaraju, and protects Shekar. Finally, the movie ends on a happy note with the marriages of Gopanna & Radha and Shekar & Tara.

Cast 
 Akkineni Nageswara Rao as Gopanna and Chandrasekhar
 Rajasree as Tara
 Bharathi as Radha
 Relangi as Pleader Narasimham
 Gummadi as Chairman Nagaraju
 Chalam as Kasthuri
 Suryakantham as Mahalakshmi
 Lakshmirajyam as Shanthamma
 Sukanya as Raji / Rajeswari
Vangara as Subbaiah

Soundtrack 
Music composed by Ghantasala.

References

External links 
 

1960s Telugu-language films
1968 comedy-drama films
Films scored by Ghantasala (musician)
Indian comedy-drama films
Telugu remakes of Kannada films